Canada took part at the 1950 British Empire Games in Auckland (New Zealand). With a total of 31 medals, Canada ranked fourth on the medal tally.

Medals

Individual medals

Gold 
Athletics:
 Bill Parnell, Men's 1 mile
 Leo Roininen, Men's Javelin Throw

Diving:
 George Athans, Men's 3 m springboard

Swimming:
 Peter Salmon, Men's 110 yards freestyle

Weightlifting:
 Gerry Gratton, Men's Middleweight Division
 Jim Varaleau, Men's Light Heavyweight Division

 Wrestling:
 Henry Hudson, Men's Welterweight Division
 Maurice Vachon, Men's Middleweight Division

Silver 

Athletics:
 Jack Hutchins, Men's 880 yards
 Stan Egerton, Men's Pole vault

Diving:
 George Athans, Men's 10 m Platform

Fencing:
 Men's sabre team

Swimming:
 Jim Portelance, Men's 1650 yards freestyle
 Men's  3×110 yards medley relay team

Weightlifting:
 Rosaire Smith, Men's Bantamweight Division

 Wrestling:
 Roland Milord, Men's Featherweight Division
 Morgan Plumb, Men's Lightweight Division

Bronze 

Athletics:
 Don Pettie, Men's 100 yards
 Bill Parnell, Men's 880 yards
 Leo Roininen, Men's Shot Put
 Svein Sigfusson, Men's Discus throw
 Doug Robinson, Men's Javelin throw
 Women's 220-110-220-110 yards relay team

 Boxing:
 Len Walters, Men's Bantamweight
 Eddie Haddad, Men's Lightweight
 Bill Pinkus, Men's Middleweight

Diving:
 Lynda Hunt, Women's 3 m  Springboard

Fencing:
 Georges Pouliot, Men's Foil
 Men's Foil team
 Men's Épée team
 Georges Pouliot, Men's Sabre

External links
 
 Commonwealth Games Canada

1950
Nations at the 1950 British Empire Games
Commonwealth Games